Dominique Wassi (born August 8, 1989 in Douala) is a professional Cameroonian footballer who  last played for Hapoel Ashkelon in the Israeli Liga Leumit.

Career
In 2006, he joined FC Schalke 04, from French team USL Dunkerque. In 2007–08 season he played in 25 games and scored 14 goals in the A-Jugend Bundesliga West. In November 2007 was promoted for a short stint to the first team. Then Wassi left in July 2008 FC Schalke 04 and signed a contract in Greece by Atromitos F.C. now played his first professional game in Europe on 14 September 2008 against Veria F.C. After 22 games who scores four goals for his club Atromitos F.C. was loaned out in July 2009 to Egaleo F.C.

In November 2011, he signed at Hapoel Petah Tikva from the Israeli Premier League.

External links
Dominique Wassi at playmakerstats.com (English version of ceroacero.es)

Taringa Profile

References

1989 births
Living people
Cameroonian footballers
FC Schalke 04 II players
Atromitos F.C. players
Ethnikos Asteras F.C. players
Hapoel Petah Tikva F.C. players
Hapoel Ashkelon F.C. players
Super League Greece players
Israeli Premier League players
Liga Leumit players
Expatriate footballers in Germany
Expatriate footballers in Greece
Expatriate footballers in Israel
Cameroonian expatriate sportspeople in Germany
Cameroonian expatriate sportspeople in Greece
Cameroonian expatriate sportspeople in Israel
Association football forwards